The 2023 ASUN men's basketball tournament was the conference postseason tournament for the ASUN Conference. The tournament was the 44th year the league has conducted a postseason tournament. The tournament was held February 27–March 5 at campus sites of the higher seeds. The winner, Kennesaw State, received the conference's automatic bid to the 2023 NCAA Tournament for the first time in school history.

Seeds 
Ten teams contested the bracket. The tournament had a new format in 2023, as all rounds were reseeded instead of a traditional set bracket. To that end, the 9 and 10 seeds played each other in round 1, and the 7 and 8 seed did as well, rather than the traditional 7/10 and 8/9 matchup.

The two tiebreakers were used by the ASUN are: 1) head-to-head record of teams with identical records and 2) NCAA NET Rankings available on day following the conclusion of ASUN regular season play.

If a team that is not eligible for the NCAA Tournament wins the ASUN Tournament, the conference's automatic bid goes to the regular-season champion. In the case of a tie for first place, the automatic bid goes to the tied team that advances furthest in the conference tournament. If all tied teams are eliminated in the same round of the tournament, the automatic bid goes to the highest seeded team in accordance with the conference's tiebreaking procedures.

Schedule

Bracket

Game summaries

First round

Quarterfinals

Semifinals

Final

References 

Tournament
ASUN men's basketball tournament
ASUN men's basketball tournament